France-IX is a Paris-based Internet exchange point (IXP) founded in June 2010 as a membership organisation.  it interconnects more than 496 members, making it the largest IXP in France.

History
France-IX was initially discussed by Raphael Maunier (then with Neo Telecoms) and Maurice Dean (then working for Google) in 2008 in Dublin. The project of setting up the internet exchange, initially called PhoenIX, was launched in December 2008. Wouter van Hulten (working for Interxion) proposed the creation of a new association named France-IX in May 2009, to unite the various IXP activities in Paris at the time under one organisation. Christian Kaufmann (working for Akamai) and Nicolas Strina (then working for Jaguar Network) soon joined the initiative.

Following the presentation, a survey was sent to the community of internet networks whose results were published during the FRnOG 14 in June 2009. Around that time, the working group got the official financial and logistics support from Jaguar Network, Google, Akamai, Interxion and Neo Telecoms and was renamed France-IX.

The first international presentation of this project was made during RIPE 59 in Lisbon.

Organisation
France-IX is composed of a non-profit association where each member holds one vote, and a commercial company, 100% owned by the association, in charge of daily operations. When a network subscribes to France-IX services, it becomes a de facto member of the association and holds the right to vote during the general assemblies. There are currently 496 members.

As of July 26, 2021, France-IX has eight board members, (Stéphane Bortzmeyer, Philippe Duby, Christian Kaufmann, Florence Lavroff, Sarah Nataf, Rebecca Stanic, Mark Tinka, Gregoir Villain). France-IX has 28 employees.

Network
As of July 26, 2021, France-IX network has 24 points of presence (PoP).

 Equinix-Telecity PA6 Condorcet
 Equinix-Telecity PA7 Courbevoie
 Scaleway Datacenter DC2	Vitry-sur-Seine
 Scaleway Datacenter DC3	Vitry-sur-Seine
 Interxion PAR1	Aubervilliers 
 Interxion PAR2	Aubervilliers 
 Interxion PAR5	Saint-Denis
 Telehouse 2	Paris
 Telehouse 3	Magny-les-Hameaux
 Data4	Nozay
 Interxion MRS1	Marseille
 Interxion MRS2	Marseille
 Jaguar Network MRS01	Marseille
 LyonIX 1	Villeurbanne
 LyonIX 2 	Vénissieux
 LyonIX 3 	Limonest
 LyonIX 4	Collombier-Saugnieu
 LyonIX 5	Bron
 LyonIX 6	Lyon
 LyonIX 7 	Lyon
 LyonIX 8 	Saint-Trivier-sur-Moignans
 GrenoblIX 1	Cogent, 33 rue Joseph Chanrion, 38000 Grenoble
 GrenoblIX 2	Eolas, 73 rue du Général Mangin, 38000 Grenoble
 AnnecIX 1 	Shelter SYANE, 2-8 rue des Garennes, 74960 Annecy

Ports of connection
Services are available through two types of ports and several bandwidth options.

Services
France-IX offers the following professional services:

 Public peering: Unicast & multicast IPv4, unicast IPv6
 Interconnections with 5 internet exchange point in France, in Italy and in Luxembourg
 Private peering, multipass peering, PNI VLAN, PNI WAVE, Cloud access 
 NTP Synchronization
 Routes servers (with the communities feature)
 Webportal: private login per member, personal detailed traffic statistics.
 24/7 NOC

Community
France-IX community comes from all around the world. Any organisation which owns an Autonomous System Number (also known as ASN) can be connected to France-IX. The connected members of the internet exchange point have various profiles:

 Operators / Services Providers / Internet Access Providers
 CDN (Content Delivery Network)
 Hosting companies
 Cloud providers
 Gamers
 Online media
 Corporations
 DNS
 Search engine

Partners
France-IX concluded five interconnections with other internet exchanges to foster the exchange of internet traffic in France and Europe.

 SFINX based in Paris and operated by the French academic network (RENATER)
 Lyonix based in Lyon, France, and operated by Rezopole
 LU-CIX based in Luxemburg
 TouIX based in Toulouse, France
 TopIX based in Torino, Italy 

In 2012, France-IX rolled out a reseller program and counts seven resellers as of August 1, 2015.

Events
 France-IX was the host for the 26th Euro-IX Forum, which took place between 12 April 2015 and 14 April 2015 in Marseille.
 France-IX led three training sessions to help Comoros and Guinea build their own national internet exchange points.

See also
 List of Internet exchange points

References

External links

Internet exchange points in France
Telecommunications in France